The 1986 United States Senate election in Oregon was held on November 8, 1986. Incumbent Republican Bob Packwood ran for re-election. U.S. Congressman Jim Weaver received the Democratic nomination. A populist Democratic congressman from Eugene, Oregon, he was a darling of the environmentalists. Weaver supported the Oregon Wilderness Act of 1984. Packwood was confident, despite the popular opponent, because had more money and a better campaign organization. After winning the party nomination, Weaver was the subject of a House Ethics Committee probe into his campaign finances, and withdrew his candidacy. Rick Bauman was selected to replace Weaver on the ballot, and lost handily to Packwood.

Democratic primary

Candidates

Declared
 Rick Bauman, State Representative
 Rod Monroe, State Senator

Withdrew
 Jim Weaver, U.S. Representative

Results

After the primary, a House Ethics Committee probe into Weaver's campaign finances led him to withdraw his candidacy and the Oregon Democratic State Central Committee selected Bauman to replace Weaver on the ballot in August, just 10 weeks before the general election.

Republican primary

Candidates
 Joe Lutz, Baptist minister and evangelical/conservative activist
 Bob Packwood, incumbent U.S. Senator

Results

General election

Candidates
 Rick Bauman, State Representative
 Bob Packwood, incumbent U.S. Senator

Results

See also 
 1986 United States Senate elections

References 

1986
Oregon
Senate